Deadly Rumors is a romance novel by Cheris F. Hodges, published in 2017 by Kensington Books.

The book received a generally positive reception, receiving reviews from publications including The New York Times, Publishers Weekly, and Kirkus Reviews.

References 

2017 American novels
American romance novels
Contemporary romance novels
Kensington Books books